Jeličić is a surname. Notable people with the surname include:

Dragoljub Jeličić (c.1902–1963), Serbian soldier
Joško Jeličić (born 1971), Croatian association football midfielder
Mirko Jeličić (born 1965), Australian association football coach
Žarko Jeličić (born 1983), Serbian football player

Serbian surnames
Croatian surnames